Dar Parchin-e Sofla (also Romanized as Dar Parchīn-e Soflá; also known as Dar Parchīn-e Pā’īn, Dar Parchīn, and Dar Parchīn Pā’īn) is a village in Milanlu Rural District, in the Central District of Esfarayen County, North Khorasan Province, Iran. At the 2006 census, its population was 132, in 27 families.

References 

Populated places in Esfarayen County